The Solar Ice Rink is an ice rink located in Nairobi, Kenya. The rink is located in the Panari Sky Centre, a large retail, leisure and hotel accommodation complex.

Opened in 2005, the Solar Ice Rink is the largest rink in Africa, and the first rink in East Africa and Central Africa. The rink cost US$700,000 to build.

References

External links 
 http://www.nairobikenya.com/entertainment/sports/solar-ice-rink/

Sport in Nairobi
Sports venues in Kenya